Arsen Grigoryevich Oganesyan (born 17 June 1990) is a Russian former professional football player of Armenian descent.

Club career
He made his professional debut in the Russian First Division in 2010 for FC Khimki.

Career statistics
Statistics accurate as of matches played on 22 August 2014

References

External links
 Career summary by sportbox.ru  
 
 

1990 births
Sportspeople from Kaluga
Living people
Russian footballers
Russian people of Armenian descent
FC Khimki players
FC Ural Yekaterinburg players
FC Sokol Saratov players
Russian Premier League players
Association football midfielders